Andrew Seidel (born June 19, 1969, Stanford, California) better known as by his stage name Andrew Diamond is an American reggae artist and music producer.

Career
Originally a drummer, Andrew also sings, plays keyboards, and guitar, he also writes, produces and mixes music for other artists.  In 1995 he performed with the Itals and was invited by singer David Isaacs to visit and record in Jamaica.  In 2000, Andrew founded the Solid Foundation Band to support Jamaican reggae artist Winston Jarrett for a US tour.  In the years following the Solid Foundation Band also supported reggae artists: the Ethiopian, Tony Rebel, Queen Ifrica, Richie Spice, Norrisman, Everton Blender and Prezident Brown.  In 2001 Andrew was introduced to Bay Area Rapper E-40 and became one of his personal recording engineers.   In 2004 Andrew moved to Jamaica where he became the Resident Engineer at the Geejam recording studio in Port Antonio.  In 2007, he released his first solo album, Diamond in the Rough and was given the "Top 10 Reggae Albums of 2007" award from ReggaeTrade Radio.  From 2010 to 2015 Andrew lived in Lusaka, Zambia where he recorded traditional African music as well as mixed the, Mecoustic album by Tarrus Riley.  In 2015 he returned to Kingston, Jamaica where he works from his private recording studio.

Discography
Diamond in the Rough (2007), SUB80

References

Dubroom.org Album Review
Zambian Post Article
Zambian Weekend Post Concert Review

External links
Allmusic.com - Andrew Diamond
Allmusic.com - Andrew Seidel

1969 births
Living people
Record producers from California
American reggae musicians
Musicians from California
People from Stanford, California
20th-century American drummers
American male drummers
20th-century American male musicians